Gurianta is a village in the Ozurgeti Municipality of Guria in western Georgia.

References

Populated places in Ozurgeti Municipality